Shawnee Field is a public use airport in Greene County, Indiana, United States. It is owned by Shawnee Field Inc. and is located three nautical miles (5.56 km) west of the central business district of Bloomfield, Indiana.

Although most U.S. airports use the same three-letter location identifier for the FAA and IATA, this airport is assigned 1I3 by the FAA but has no designation from the IATA.

Facilities and aircraft 
It has one runway designated 18/36 with a turf surface measuring 2,160 by 150 feet (658 x 46 m).

For the 12-month period ending December 31, 2007, the airport had 8,283 aircraft operations, an average of 23 per day: 100% general aviation with a few ultralights. At that time there were 21 aircraft based at this airport: 86% single-engine and 14% ultralights.

Accidents 
On August 25, 2009, two men were killed when their ultralight aircraft either failed to takeoff or failed to land. The craft crashed into a field.

References

External links 
 Aerial photo as of 29 March 1998 from USGS The National Map via MSR Maps
 

Airports in Indiana
Transportation buildings and structures in Greene County, Indiana